Tracks of Destiny is a 1961 travel book by Ion Idriess.

References

External links
Tracks of Destiny at AustLit

1961 non-fiction books
Books by Ion Idriess
Australian travel books
Angus & Robertson books